Mys Shmidta (lit. The cape, but not the settlement, was formerly known as North Cape (or Cape North). Cape Billings is located to the west of it and Cape Vankarem is to the east. As of the 2010 Census, its population was 492; down from 705 recorded in the 2002 Census.

It was founded in 1931 as a part of the Soviet Union's development of its Arctic air defenses. Changes in the manner in which national defenses are constructed in recent decades have led to a decline in the settlement's importance, although it remains Chukotka's most important main northern sea port after Pevek.

History
Cape North, or Cape Schmidt as it is now called, was first reached by James Cook in 1778 when he sailed through the Bering Strait and into the Chukchi Sea, demonstrating to people in Europe and North America that Russia and Alaska were separated.

The modern settlement was founded in 1931 as a part of the Soviet Union's attempts to develop the extreme northeast of the country. The settlement itself, its airport, and the nearby cape were all named after Otto Schmidt, with Mys Shmidta forming the central base for the enterprises involved in the mining of tin and gold.

In 1954, the airfield was developed as part of the plan to create a ring of Soviet Air Force air bases around the Arctic for the use of its strategic bomber fleet during the Cold War. During the Cold War, this airfield formed a network of forward staging bases inside the Arctic Circle. The use of strategic bomber forward staging bases was dictated by geography and weather. The northern parts of the Soviet Union closest to the United States are in the Arctic, with hostile weather conditions. Consequently, Soviet strategic bombers were normally stationed at bases in more temperate parts of the Soviet Union, flying training missions from these forward staging bases.

In 1962, Mys Shmidta was granted urban-type settlement status.

Geography

The settlement is positioned on a spit which separates the Akatan Lagoon from the open sea and protects the airport from the full effects of the Arctic Ocean. A little distance to the northwest is the cape from which the settlement gets its name and just beyond this lies the rural Chukchi locality of Ryrkaypiy. Cape Yakan is located further to the west.

Climate
Mys Shmidta, by the very nature of its location, has a polar climate (Köppen ET) and is at the mercy of Arctic conditions, which leaves it isolated throughout the winter and can pose a danger to shipping during the brief summer as supply ships try to make their deliveries. The lowest temperature ever recorded was  recorded on 2 February 1978.

The importance attached to the summer months from a logistical standpoint was well illustrated in 1983, when winter set in earlier than predicted and resulted in Mys Shmidta and a number of other coastal ports in the Russian Far East closing early due to ice. Although unloading was delayed due to ice for a fortnight, the first supply ship convoy to Mys Shmidta arrived as planned. However, a severe drop in temperature through August, much earlier than usual, caused a significantly greater concentration of ice in the Long Strait and strong northerly winds forced the semi-permanent Ayon ice sheet onto the northern coast of Chukotka. By October, the ice had thickened to such a degree that a convoy of ships, including the freighter Nina Sagaydak, Kamensk-Uralsky, together with the icebreakers Kapitan Sorokin and Vladivostok, was held fast by October in sea ice about halfway between Mys Shmidta and Vankarem. This proved chaotic with several ships drifting freely in the ice, hulls grinding against one another. Although the ships eventually separated, the damage cause to the Nina Sagaydak proved too severe and she sank; the first ship to be sunk by ice in Soviet waters since the Vitimles in 1963. The remaining ships were freed by icebreakers and towed to the edge of the sea ice. This situation placed great strain on the settlement's resources as it struggled to deal with such a large amount of shipping and the associated problem of how to store a much larger than usual quantity of cargo, much of which was not intended to be frozen, while authorities readied the winter snow roads.

Administrative and municipal status
Within the framework of administrative divisions, Mys Shmidta is directly subordinated to Iultinsky District. As a municipal division, the urban-type settlement of Mys Shmidta is incorporated within Iultinsky Municipal District as Mys Shmidta Urban Settlement.

Economy

The settlement is populated mostly by indigenous people, whose economy is driven mainly by reindeer herding and low level gold mining however, there is little mining done in the vicinity of Mys Shmidta.

Transportation

Port
The port at Mys Shmidta is generally open between July and September, although the waters surrounding the port are shallow which limits the type of ships that can serve the area, with the port operated by the Russian firm Almazzoloto.

Though it has shrunk since the days of the Cold War, Mys Shmidta is still alongside Pevek the main northern sea port in Chukotka. Following the dissolution of the Soviet Union, imports all but ceased in the early to mid-1990s, although in 1991 Mys Shmidta, importing nearly 30,000 tons of mainly American fuel, dealt with significantly more cargo than ports such as Pevek. The decline in the overall volume of cargo passing through Mys Shmidta continued throughout the 1990s, with less than 50,000 tons being handled in 1997 and just over 1,000 tons the following year, This is in part due to the declining economy of the region, which has caused a fall in investment in the port infrastructure, which, in turn, limits the maximum potential turnover of the port.

It is difficult to see where future cargo exports might come from. While gold is mined in Bilibino, with lower-level mining maintained at Iultin and Polyarny, these activities do not produce significant cargo volumes for the northern sea route, nor does the extraction of any other minerals in the area. Although part of the Northern Sea Route's series of ports, Mys Shmidta, as a port, will be dominated by imports of food and coal for the settlement and the surrounding rural localities.

A federal government decision in 1997 led to the establishment of an emergency radio station in Mys Shmidta as well as other northern Sea route ports to specifically monitor distress and salvage frequencies.

Air transport

Immediately to the southwest of the settlement is the Mys Shmidta Airport.

Roads
Mys Shmidta is not connected to any other part of Chukotka by permanent road. Transport must either be by air or along unpaved roads. One such unpaved road is linking Mys Shmidta with Egvekinot.

Tourism
Mys Shmidta is the starting point for any tourist wishing to explore Wrangel Island, a UNESCO World Heritage Site. The nature reserve's headquarters are in Mys Shmidta.

See also
List of inhabited localities in Iultinsky District

References

Notes

Sources

Petit Fute. Chukotka.
J. C. Beaglehole. The Life of Captain James Cook.
M. C. Serreze and R. G. Barry. The Arctic Climate System
В. В. Леонтьев и К. А. Новикова (V. V. Leontyev and K. A. Novikova). "Топонимический словарь северо-востока СССР" (Toponymic Dictionary of the Northeastern USSR). Магадан, 1989
W. Barr and E. A. Wilson. The Shipping Crisis in the Soviet Eastern Arctic at the Close of the 1983 Navigation Season
V. Martyshin. "On the Route from Pevek", published in Vodny Transport
C. L. Ragner. Northern Sea Route Cargo Flows and Infrastructure—Present State and Future Potential. The Fridtjof Nansen Institute, Report 13/2000.
Y. M. Ivanov, A. P. Ushakov, and A. N. Yakovlov. Russian Administration of the Northern Sea Route. Central INSROP Working Paper, #106.

Urban-type settlements in Chukotka Autonomous Okrug
Populated places of Arctic Russia
Chukchi Sea
Populated places established in 1931
1931 establishments in the Soviet Union